Edgardo Migriño Chatto (born February 21, 1960), more commonly known as Edgar Chatto, is a Filipino lawyer and politician who is currently the Representative of the 1st Legislative District of Bohol since 2019. He previously served in that position from 2001 to 2010. 

He was also Governor of the Province of Bohol for three terms from 2010 to 2019.

Biography and career 
Edgardo Migriño Chatto, nicknamed Edgar or Eddie, was born on February 21, 1960, in Malate, Manila, Philippines. He is the son of the late Eladio Chatto and former Mayor of Balilihan, Bohol Victoria Migriño Chatto. A consistent honor student, he finished both his elementary and secondary education at the Divine Word College of Tagbilaran (now Holy Name University), in 1973 and 1979 respectively. He finished  Bachelor in Economics at the University of the Philippines School of Economics in Diliman, Quezon City in April 1981.  He attended the Ateneo de Manila University for his Bachelor in Laws (1984–1988) and graduated at the Holy Name University in 1988. He finished his Masters in Government Management at the Pamantasan ng Lungsod ng Maynila Graduate School of Business and Management as a DILG-LGA scholar in April 1998. In 1991, he finished the Local Administration and Development Course at the University of the Philippines.  He also attended the John F. Kennedy School of Government at Harvard University in Massachusetts, U.S. in 1999.

Chatto was faculty member of the Divine Word College of Tagbilaran from 1981 to 1982.

He is married to Maria Pureza Chatto (nee Veloso) with whom he has one daughter, Esther Patrisha Veloso Chatto.

Chatto, with Call Sign DW7BDC, holds a Technician Class Amateur Radio License.

Political career
He started his political career as board member of the Province of Bohol representing the youth sector when he served as president of the Kabataang Barangay from 1980 to 1986. In 1988, he was elected  as municipal mayor of the municipality of Balilihan, Bohol and served until 1995. He became Vice Governor of the province of Bohol and served as vice governor from 1995 - 2001. From 2001 up to 2010, he was a member of the House of Representatives as representative of the first district of Bohol. In the May 10, 2010, elections, he won as the 25th Governor of the Province of Bohol, Philippines.

Committee Membership
As a congressman from 2001 to 2010, Chatto was the Chairman of the House Committee on Tourism and Senior Vice Chairman of the House Committee on Agriculture, Food and Fisheries.  He also had memberships in the House Committees on Accounts; Basic Education and Culture; Ethics; Foreign Affairs; Games and Amusement; Higher and Technical Education; Labor and Employment; Legislative Franchises; Local Government; Public Works and Highways; Revision of Laws; Ways and Means; and Justice.

Since 2019, he is the current Chairman of the House Committee on Climate Change and Vice Chairman of the House Special Committee on Persons with Disabilities, and on Tourism. He is also a member for the majority in the House Committee on Economic Affairs.

Awards
 National Centennial Lingkod Bayan Awardee for Outstanding Work Performance (2000) - Civil Service Commission
 National Dangal Ng Bayan Award (2011) - Civil Service Commission
 Doña Aurora Aragon Quezon Award for Highly Distinguished Leadership in Promoting Humanitarian Objectives (1997) - Philippine National Red Cross
 One of the Ten Outstanding Boholanos Around the World (1998) - Confederation of Boholanos in the USA and Canada and the First Consolidated Bank
 Most Outstanding Vice Governor of the Philippines (1997) - League of Vice Governors of the Philippines
 Most Outstanding Mayor of the Philippines (1991)
 National Presidential Leadership Award for Outstanding Youth Leaders (1985) - Parangal sa Pamumuno
 Most Outstanding Alumnus for  Government Service (1996) - Ship for Southeast Asian Youth Program (SSEAYP)
 Lesage Award, Most Outstanding Alumnus for Government Service (1997) -  Holy Name University (formerly Divine Word College of Tagbilaran)
 Most Outstanding Youth Leader of Bohol - Philippine National Red Cross
 Leadership Awards from different institutions:
 Holy Name University
 Gerry Roxas Foundation
 Science Foundation of the Philippines
 Kabataang Barangay
 Local Admin. & Dev’t Program Alumni Association of the Philippines
 National And Regional Recognitions by:
 National Gold HAMIS Award (Health and Management Information System)
 Galing Pook Award
 Clean and Green Contest

References 

*Curriculum vitae Congressman Edgardo M. Chatto
Personal Information
Political Information

Further reading
 List of House Bills authored by Congressman Edgar Chatto
 House Bills Download Center
 House Committee Meetings
 Chatto: “Pretty boy” of honesty, sincerity Bohol Sunday Post 17 January 2007.
 Dwight Ebojo. Livestock auction center can spur development - Chatto Bohol Sunday Post.  2 April 2006.
 Die-hard supporters of Chatto strike back The Bohol Times. January 8, 2007
 Ric V. Obedencio Chatto's supporters strike back The Bohol Chronicle. January 21, 2007
 Impeachment 2006: How they voted GMA News. 24 August 2006.
 House Resolution 593 ASEM ASEAN 2005. 16 February 2005.
 GMA would depend on Divine wisdom in carrying out her program for the next 6 years Office of the Press Secretary. 3 July 2004
 Ben Cal. How to combat poverty, rebellion The Manila Times. December 4, 2006.
 CPG honored at 110th b-day VGO News November 5, 2006
 Avigail Olarte Impeachment 2005 - 2006: How the congressmen voted Philippine Center for Investigative Journalism. 24 August 2006.

External links 
Edgar Chatto Official Website
Makati Business Club Congress Watch

1960 births
Living people
Governors of Bohol
Harvard Kennedy School alumni
Pamantasan ng Lungsod ng Maynila alumni
Members of the House of Representatives of the Philippines from Bohol
Members of the Bohol Provincial Board
Mayors of places in Bohol
People from Malate, Manila
People from Bohol
Boholano people
University of the Philippines Diliman alumni
Ateneo de Manila University alumni